John W. Childs (born 1941/1942) is an American billionaire businessman, the CEO and founder of J.W. Childs Associates, a private equity firm.

Early life
Childs earned a BA from Yale University and an MBA from Columbia University.

Career
Childs has worked for Prudential Insurance Company, and as the vice president of Canada Carbon. Childs worked for Thomas H. Lee Partners, where he arranged the purchase of Snapple. He has a reported net worth of $1.2 billion.

Politics
Childs is a major Republican donor, giving $1 million to Mitt Romney's campaign and $1.1 million to the Club for Growth, as well as donating to the campaigns of Congressmen Eric Cantor and Paul Ryan.

2019 solicitation charge
In February 2019, Childs was charged with solicitation of prostitution in connection with a police investigation into Florida massage parlors. Childs denied the charges. After being charged, Childs stepped down as chairman of J.W. Childs Associates.

References

Living people
Massachusetts Republicans
Yale University alumni
American chief executives of financial services companies
Columbia Business School alumni
American billionaires
1940s births